Jazmine Sepúlveda (born April 10, 1985) is a Puerto Rican professional basketball player who currently plays for Montañeras de Morovis of the Baloncesto Superior Nacional Femenino (BSNF).

She was a member of the team which competed for Puerto Rico at the 2011 Pan American Games, winning a gold medal.

References

External links 
 Profile at fiba.com

1985 births
Living people
Sportspeople from Brooklyn
Basketball players from New York City
Puerto Rican women's basketball players
Shooting guards
Basketball players at the 2011 Pan American Games
Pan American Games gold medalists for Puerto Rico
Pan American Games medalists in basketball
Medalists at the 2011 Pan American Games